Jason Keema Hart (born April 29, 1978) is an American basketball coach and former professional player who is the head coach of the NBA G League Ignite. He was born in Los Angeles.

College career 
From 1996 to 2000, he attended New York's Syracuse University, where he became the first freshman in the Big East Conference's history to lead it in minutes played. Later on, he earned other accolades as an NCAA player, such as becoming his college's all-time leader in steals and second place among assist leaders. As a senior, Hart made the Big East's All-First Team. He was also selected to the Syracuse All-Century Basketball team.

NBA career 
Hart joined the NBA with the Milwaukee Bucks in the 2000–01 season, but he only saw action in one game, scoring two points.

Starting the 2001–02 season in the newly created NBDL with the Asheville Altitude, he was called in December by the San Antonio Spurs, appearing in 10 games. He played in the Greek A1 League with Makedonikos BC in 2002–03, returning to the Spurs for the 2003–04 season, where he played in 53 games, averaging 3.3 points.

Hart was signed by the Bobcats as a free agent before the 2004–05 season, and made the first steal in Bobcats history in their first game. Previously, in a 128–126 losing effort in their second preseason game, Hart made a three-point shot as time expired to send the game against the Washington Wizards into a second overtime en route to 19 points.

In the 2004–05 season, Hart set career highs in many categories including: points per game (9.5), assists per game (5.0), and rebounds per game (2.7). He finished third in the league in assist-to-turnover ratio, with 3.6 assists for every turnover. After the season, Hart was traded to the Sacramento Kings.

On March 2, 2007, Hart was waived by the Kings. He was signed a few days later by the Los Angeles Clippers. On July 13, 2007, Hart signed with the Utah Jazz. Originally serving as the backup to Deron Williams, an injury forced him to sit for 8 games. Ronnie Price's solid play during that time, nearly removed him from the rotation.

On July 23, 2008, Hart was traded back to the Clippers in exchange for Brevin Knight.

On February 27, 2009, Hart was waived by the Clippers.

On March 3, 2009, Hart was signed by the Nuggets for the remainder of the season.

On September 28, 2009, Hart signed with the Minnesota Timberwolves. He was traded to the Phoenix Suns on December 29, 2009, for Alando Tucker and cash. The Suns immediately waived him. On February 5, 2010, Hart signed a ten-day contract with the New Orleans Hornets. Hart's final NBA game was on February 10, 2010, in a 93–85 win over the Boston Celtics. In his final game, Hart recorded two assists and one rebound.

Coaching career
After his playing career ended, Hart coached AAU basketball in Los Angeles and served as head coach at Taft High School in LA.  On May 12, 2012, Hart was hired as an assistant coach at Pepperdine, under head coach Marty Wilson. In 2013, he joined Andy Enfield's staff at the University of Southern California. In 2021, he was named the head coach of the NBA G League Ignite, a developmental team for players coming out of high school that plays against other teams in the NBA G League.

Personal
Jason Hart is married to his high school sweetheart, Brandi Hart. They live with their two sons Jason Jr and Justin. Hart's cousin is 2011–12 Syracuse Orange men's basketball player Brandon Triche.

NBA career statistics

Regular season 

|-
| align="left" | 
| align="left" | Milwaukee
| 1 || 0 || 10.0 || 1.000 || .000 || .000 || .0 || 1.0 || .0 || .0 || 2.0
|-
| align="left" | 
| align="left" | San Antonio
| 10 || 0 || 9.2 || .526 || .000 || 1.000 || 1.3 || 1.2 || .7 || .1 || 2.6
|-
| align="left" | 
| align="left" | San Antonio
| 53 || 5 || 12.5 || .447 || .222 || .767 || 1.5 || 1.5 || .5 || .1 || 3.3
|-
| align="left" | 
| align="left" | Charlotte
| 74 || 27 || 25.5 || .449 || .368 || .785 || 2.7 || 5.0 || 1.3 || .2 || 9.5
|-
| align="left" | 
| align="left" | Sacramento
| 66 || 0 || 12.4 || .389 || .290 || .661 || 1.1 || 1.1 || .5 || .1 || 3.3
|-
| align="left" | 
| align="left" | Sacramento
| 13 || 0 || 7.7 || .500 || .500 || .909 || 1.2 || .8 || .2 || .0 || 3.3
|-
| align="left" | 
| align="left" | L.A. Clippers
| 23 || 22 || 32.4 || .438 || .174 || .889 || 3.6 || 4.0 || 1.8 || .0 || 9.0
|-
| align="left" | 
| align="left" | Utah
| 57 || 0 || 10.6 || .322 || .355 || .844 || 1.0 || 1.5 || .5 || .1 || 2.9
|-
| align="left" | 
| align="left" | L.A. Clippers
| 28 || 2 || 11.1 || .298 || .000 || .789 || 1.5 || 1.5 || .4 || .1 || 2.3
|-
| align="left" | 
| align="left" | Denver
| 11 || 0 || 3.3 || .500 || .000 || .750 || .4 || .5 || .0 || .0 || 1.2
|-
| align="left" | 
| align="left" | Minnesota
| 1 || 0 || 5.0 || .000 || .000 || .000 || .0 || 1.0 || 1.0 || .0 || .0
|-
| align="left" | 
| align="left" | New Orleans
| 4 || 0 || 4.3 || 1.000 || .000 || .000 || .5 || 1.3 || .3 || .3 || .5
|-
| align="left" | Career
| align="left" | 
| 341 || 56 || 15.5 || .417 || .315 || .788 || 1.7 || 2.3 || .7 || .1 || 4.8

Playoffs 

|-
| align="left" | 2004
| align="left" | San Antonio
| 7 || 0 || 8.9 || .550 || .000 || .000 || .4 || .1 || .7 || .0 || 3.1
|-
| align="left" | 2006
| align="left" | Sacramento
| 5 || 0 || 10.4 || .308 || .000 || 1.000 || .4 || .6 || .6 || .0 || 2.0
|-
| align="left" | 2008
| align="left" | Utah
| 2 || 0 || 3.0 || .500 || .000 || .000 || .0 || .0 || .0 || .0 || 1.0
|-
| align="left" | 2009
| align="left" | Denver
| 9 || 0 || 2.1 || .500 || .000 || .000 || .3 || .6 || .2 || .1 || .2
|-
| align="left" | Career
| align="left" | 
| 23 || 0 || 6.0 || .459 || .000 || 1.000 || .3 || .4 || .4 || .0 || 1.6

See also
 List of NCAA Division I men's basketball career steals leaders

References

External links
NBA.com Profile - Jason Hart 
NBDL Stats
OrangeHoops Profile

1978 births
Living people
American expatriate basketball people in Greece
American men's basketball players
Asheville Altitude players
Basketball coaches from California
Basketball players from Los Angeles
Charlotte Bobcats players
Denver Nuggets players
High school basketball coaches in California
Inglewood High School (California) alumni
Los Angeles Clippers players
Makedonikos B.C. players
Milwaukee Bucks draft picks
Milwaukee Bucks players
Minnesota Timberwolves players
NBA G League Ignite coaches
New Orleans Hornets players
Pepperdine Waves men's basketball coaches
Point guards
Sacramento Kings players
San Antonio Spurs players
Syracuse Orange men's basketball players
USC Trojans men's basketball coaches
Utah Jazz players